Lukáš Pellegrini (born 10 May 1988) is a Slovak football midfielder who currently plays for Sitno Banská Štiavnica.

Club career
Pellegrini made his debut in the Corgoň Liga, when he played for ViOn Zlaté Moravce. He also he played UEFA Cup qualifying matches against Almaty and Russian giant Zenit St. Petersburg. In January 2013, he came to transferred to Spartak Myjava.

Non-football activities
In 2022, Pellegrini ran as a candidate for a post of a deputy in Regional Parliament of Banská Bystrica Region as well as City Council of Banská Štiavnica. Pellegrini served as a professional firefighter commencing in later years of his career.

References

External links
 Eurofotbal profile

1988 births
Living people
Sportspeople from Žiar nad Hronom
Slovak footballers
Association football midfielders
FC ViOn Zlaté Moravce players
FK Žiar nad Hronom players
MFK Lokomotíva Zvolen players
MŠK Novohrad Lučenec players
FC ŠTK 1914 Šamorín players
Spartak Myjava players
FK Pohronie players
FK Sitno Banská Štiavnica players
Slovak Super Liga players
2. Liga (Slovakia) players
5. Liga players
FK Sitno Banská Štiavnica managers